Dial J. J. 5 is an album by the J. J. Johnson Quintet which was released on the Columbia label.

Reception

Allmusic awarded the album 3 stars.

Track listing
 "Tea Pot" (J. J. Johnson) - 5:34
 "Barbados" (Charlie Parker) - 4:37
 "In a Little Provincial Town" (Bobby Jaspar) - 4:21
 "Cette Chose" (Jaspar) - 3:19
 "Blue Haze"  (Miles Davis) - 5:12
 "Love Is Here to Stay" (George Gershwin, Ira Gershwin) - 2:48
 "So Sorry Please" (Bud Powell) - 4:19
 "It Could Happen to You" (Jimmy Van Heusen, Johnny Burke) - 3:52
 "Bird Song" (Thad Jones) - 5:42
 "Old Devil Moon" (Burton Lane, Yip Harburg) - 6:45
Recorded at Columbia 30th Street Studios, NYC on January 29, 1957 (tracks 5, 6, 8 & 9), January 31, 1957 (tracks 2-4) and May 14, 1957 (tracks 1, 7 & 10)

Personnel
J. J. Johnson – trombone
Bobby Jaspar – tenor saxophone, flute
Tommy Flanagan – piano
Wilbur Little – bass
Elvin Jones – drums

References

Columbia Records albums
J. J. Johnson albums
1957 albums